Stenocara is a genus of darkling beetles which is native to southern Africa. Several species are endemic to Namibia.

Species
Species include:
 Stenocara aenescens
 Stenocara brevicollis Haag-Rutenberg
 Stenocara dentata Koch
 Stenocara dilaticornis Koch
 Stenocara fitzsimonsi Koch
 Stenocara gracilipes 
 Stenocara inaffectata Gebien
 Stenocara kalaharica Koch
 Stenocara magnophthalma Koch
 Stenocara namaquensis Gebien
 Stenocara pisceflumine Penrith
 Stenocara quadrimaculata Koch
 Stenocara tenuicornis Penrith

Formerly in this genus:
 Stenocara eburnea is now Cauricara eburnea
 Stenocara desertica is now Cauricara desertica

Gallery

References

Tenebrionidae
Beetles of Africa